Hoseynabad-e Hajj Kazem (also Romanized as Ḩoseynābād-e Ḩājj Kāz̧em) is a village in Kuhestan Rural District, in the Central District of Nain County, Isfahan Province, Iran. At the 2006 census, its population was 11, in 7 families.

References 

Populated places in Nain County